Ian Robertson is a Scottish retired amateur football wing half who made over 180 appearances in the Scottish League for Queen's Park.

Personal life 
Robertson attended North Kelvinside School.

References

Scottish footballers
Scottish Football League players
Queen's Park F.C. players
Association football wing halves
Year of birth missing (living people)
Place of birth missing (living people)
Living people
Scotland amateur international footballers